Ball at the Savoy is a 1955 West German musical comedy film directed by Paul Martin and starring Rudolf Prack, Nadja Tiller, and Peter W. Staub. Inspired by the 1932 operetta Ball im Savoy by Paul Abraham, this film is closer to a revue show than the previous 1935 film adaptation.

The film's sets were designed by the art director Albrecht Becker and Herbert Kirchhoff. It was shot at the Wandsbek Studios in Hamburg.

Cast

References

Bibliography

External links 
 

1955 films
1955 musical comedy films
German musical comedy films
West German films
1950s German-language films
Films directed by Paul Martin
Films scored by Paul Abraham
Operetta films
Films based on operettas
Remakes of German films
Films shot at Wandsbek Studios
German black-and-white films
1950s German films